An Imperfect Murder (also known as The Private Life of a Modern Woman) is a 2017 American drama film written and directed by James Toback. It was screened out of competition at the 74th Venice International Film Festival.

It was released in limited theaters and on VOD in the United States on October 9, 2020 by Quiver Distribution.

It was the final film to star Charles Grodin, who died on May 18, 2021.

Cast
 Sienna Miller as Vera Lockman
 Alec Baldwin as Detective McCutcheon 
 Charles Grodin as Arthur
 Colleen Camp as Elaine Lockman
 John Buffalo Mailer as Leon
 Oliver "Power" Grant as Rameesh
 Carl Icahn as Himself
 James Toback as Franklin

Reception

References

External links
 
 

2017 films
2017 drama films
2010s English-language films
American drama films
Films directed by James Toback
Quiver Distribution films
2010s American films